Adam Bice (born June 30, 1989) is an American football center who is currently a free agent. He played college football for the University of Akron. He went undrafted during the 2013 NFL Draft, and signed as an undrafted free agent with the Arizona Cardinals. He has also been a member of the Cleveland Gladiators of the Arena Football League (AFL).

Early years
Bice is from Dresden, Ohio, where he attended Tri-Valley High School and played for the football team.

College career
Bice enrolled in the University of Akron, where he played for the Akron Zips football team from 2008 to 2012.

Professional career
After going undrafted during the 2013 NFL Draft, Bice signed with the Arizona Cardinals as an undrafted free agent.
On May 18, 2017, Bice was assigned to the Cleveland Gladiators.

External links
Akron Zips bio

1989 births
Living people
Players of American football from Ohio
American football centers
Akron Zips football players
Arizona Cardinals players
Cleveland Gladiators players
People from Dresden, Ohio